The 2004–05 Toto Cup Artzit was the 6th time the cup was being contested as a competition for the third tier in the Israeli football league system.

The competition was won by Hapoel Ashkelon, who had beaten Hapoel Ramat Gan 4–2 on penalties after 3–3 in the final.

Group stage

Group A

Group B

Knockout rounds
{| class="wikitable" style="text-align: center"
|-
!Home Team
!Score
!Away Team
|-

Final

See also
 2004–05 Toto Cup Al
 2004–05 Toto Cup Leumit

External links
 Israel Cups 2004/05 RSSSF

Artzit
Toto Cup Artzit
Toto Cup Artzit